Jackson Paul Lee Hopkins (born July 1, 2004) is an American soccer player who plays as a midfielder for Major League Soccer club D.C. United.

Club career
Hopkins spent time with the Virginia Development Academy, before having spells with both the D.C. United and New York Red Bulls academy teams.

On July 27, 2021, Hopkins appeared for D.C. United's USL Championship affiliate side Loudoun United, coming on as an 82nd-minute substitute during a 3–5 loss to Charleston Battery.

On April 13, 2022, D.C. United signed Hopkins as the 18th homegrown player in club history.

Career statistics

Honors
United States U20
CONCACAF U-20 Championship: 2022

References

2004 births
Living people
American soccer players
Association football midfielders
D.C. United players
Loudoun United FC players
USL Championship players
Soccer players from Virginia
Sportspeople from Arlington County, Virginia
Virginia Cavaliers men's soccer players
Homegrown Players (MLS)
Major League Soccer players